Senator Lanham may refer to:

Charles C. Lanham (1928–2015), West Virginia State Senate
John Lanham (1924–2007), Hawaii State Senate